Handal (meaning "bitter colocynth") is a surname. Notable people with the surname include:

Esteban Handal Perez (born 1965), Honduran politician
Muna Handal-Dayeh (born 1957), Palestinian Arab-American businesswoman
Nathalie Handal (born 1969), French-American poet and writer
Nils Handal (1906–1992), Norwegian politician
Schafik Hándal (1930–2006), Salvadoran politician
Handal, an evil king in the epic Taghribat Bani Hilal

See also
Handala

References

Arabic-language surnames